The Catedral Basílica San Carlos Borromeo or Puno Cathedral is a Catholic church in the city of Puno in south-eastern Peru. It is in the Andean Baroque architectural tradition, and is the seat of the Roman Catholic Diocese of Puno.

The church was built in 1757.

References

1757 establishments in the Spanish Empire
Roman Catholic cathedrals in Peru
Andean Baroque architecture in Peru
Roman Catholic churches completed in 1757
Basilica churches in Peru
Buildings and structures in Puno Region
18th-century Roman Catholic church buildings in Peru